Nesse may refer to:

 Nesse (Hörsel), a river in Thuringia, Germany, tributary to the Hörsel, 54.5 km long
 Nesse (Werra), a river in North Hessen, Germany, tributary to the Werra, 5.9 km long
 Nesse, Dornum, a village in Dornum municipality, Aurich District, in Lower Saxony, Germany
 Nesse, Loxstedt, a village in Loxstedt municipality, Cuxhaven District, in Lower Saxony, Germany
 Nesse Valley Railway, the rail line of the Gotha–Leinefelde railway between Gotha and Behringen in Thuringia, Germany

People
 Nesse Godin (born 1928), Lithuanian American Holocaust survivor, who dedicated her adult life to teaching and sharing memories of the Holocaust
 Johannes Nesse (1891–1948), Norwegian newspaper editor
 Åse-Marie Nesse (1934–2001), Norwegian philologist, translator and poet
 Randolph M. Nesse (1948–), American physician and evolutionary biologist

See also
 Mittleres Nessetal, a collective municipality in Gotha District, Thuringia, Germany
 Nesse-Apfelstädt, a municipality in Gotha District, Thuringia, Germany
 Nesseaue, a collective municipality in Gotha District, Thuringia, Germany